Ne majasi ne parat maatrubhumilaa, Saagara Pran Talamalala is a Marathi patriotic song based on a poem written by Vinayak Damodar Savarkar.

Performance
The original music was composed by Pandit Hridaynath Mangeshkar (पं. हृदयनाथ मंगेशकर). It has been recorded by him and Lata, Usha and Meena Mangeshkar.

Asha Bhosle songs
Lata Mangeshkar songs
Marathi-language songs
Songs with music by Hridayanath Mangeshkar
Songs based on poems